Olivella tergina is a species of small sea snail, marine gastropod mollusk in the subfamily Olivellinae, in the family Olividae, the olives.  Species in the genus Olivella are commonly called dwarf olives.

Description
The length of the shell varies between 11 mm and 16 mm.

Distribution
This marine species occurs off Mexico to Panama and Peru -
West coast of The Americas.

References

tergina
Gastropods described in 1835